Al-Muwaylih (El Muweilih) was a Palestinian village in the Jaffa Subdistrict. It was depopulated during the 1948 Palestine War.

History

British Mandate era
In the  1931 census of Palestine, conducted by the British Mandate authorities Malalha had 37  Muslim inhabitants.

In  the  1945 statistics the population numbered 360 Muslims, who had a total of 3,342 dunams of land.  Of this, 949 dunums were planted with citrus and bananas, 27 dunums were plantations and irrigable land, 1,796 were for cereals,  while a total of 194 dunams were classified as non-cultivable areas.

1948, aftermath
Neve Yarak is located, partly on Al-Muwaylih land, and partly on land formerly belonging to Jaljuliya.

By 1992, it was described: "The site is very difficult to identify. Some of the houses still stand, deserted, amidst wild vegetation. One of them belonged to Hashim  al-Jayyusi, who later became a Jordanian cabinet minister. It is a two-storey, concrete structure with rectangular doors and windows and a stairway in front that leads to the second storey. The other villas have been reduced to rubble. The land in the area is cultivated."

References

Bibliography

External links
Welcome To al-Muwaylih
al-Muwaylih, Zochrot
Survey of Western Palestine, Map 13: IAA,  Wikimedia commons
Al-Muwayliha from the Khalil Sakakini Cultural Center
Al-Muweileh  from Dr. Moslih Kanaaneh 

Arab villages depopulated during the 1948 Arab–Israeli War
District of Jaffa